This is a list of notable artists of Armenian descent.

A 
Abrahamyan, Khachik – painter
Agemian, Ariel – painter
Aghamyan, Karen – painter
Akopjans, Arturs – painter
Aivazovsky, Ivan – painter
al-Armani, Yuhanna – painter
Aleksanyan, Gegham – painter, sculptor
Arutiunian, Alexander – composer, pianist
Arzruni, Şahan – classical pianist
Avagyan, Ashot – painter 
Atamian, Charles Garabed – painter
Avedisian, Edward – painter
Avedissian, Apo – filmmaker, painter, photographer, and writer
Avetisyan, Andranik – painter
Avetisyan, Minas – painter
Aznavour, Charles – singer-songwriter

B 
Babajanyan, Arno – composer, pianist
Baghdasaryan, Arkady (Arko) – painter
Baghramian, Nairy – sculptor
Bashinjagyan, Gevorg – painter

C 
Carzou, Jean – painter
Chahine, Edgar – painter
Ciraciyan, David – painter
Civanian, Mgirdic – painter

D 
Davit Gharibyan – Opera and Ballet artist 
Der Haroutunian, Arto – painter
Dolmayan, John – musician
Dudukgian, Rehn – fashion designer
Durian, Ohan – musician

E 
Egoyan, Eve – pianist, composer

G 
Gabrielyan, Ada – artist and teacher
Gagosian, Larry – art collector
Gasparyan, Djivan – musician, composer
Galentz (Kharmandaian), Haroutioun – Ottoman painter
Garabedian, Charles – painter
Gegisian, Aikaterini – contemporary artist
Gorky, Arshile – painter
Grigoryan, Stella – painter, sculptor
Guedel, Kaloust – painter, sculptor
Güler, Ara – photographer
Gyulamiryan, Susanna – art critic, curator

H 
Hakobyan, Mariam – sculptor
Hovhaness, Alan – composer

J
Jansem, Jean – painter

K 
Kalfayan, Zareh – painter
Kaputikyan, Silva – poet
Karsh, Malak – landscape photographer
Karsh, Yousuf – Canada; Egyptian-born portrait photographer
Katchadourian, Sarkis – artist
Kazarian, Jackie – painter, video and installation artist
Kazaz, Emil – sculptor, painter
Khachatryan, Garegin – ceramic-sculptor, painter
Khachatryan, Rafik – sculptor
Khachatryan, Sergey – classical violinist
Khachaturian, Aram – composer
Khachaturian, Ontronik – musician, songwriter
Khanjyan, Grigor – painter
Kochar, Yervand – sculptor, painter
Komitas – composer, music ethologist

M 
Mactarian, Ludwig – artist
Malakian, Daron – American-born musician
Manas Family – family of painters
Manavyan, Zareh – painter
Manookian, Arman – painter
Manoukian, Martiros – painter
Mansurian, Tigran – composer 
Margaryan, Hripsime – painter
Martirosyan, Armenouhi – abstract painter
Matulyan, Margarita – sculptor
Melkonian, Ashot – painter
Mikli, Alain – designer
Mnatsakanian Alina – visual artist 
Mosdichian, Varteni – painter
Moskofian, Zareh – painter

P 
Peleshyan, Artavazd – filmmaker
Peterson, Denis – painter
Petrosyan, Arev – painter, Honored artist of the Republic of Armenia
Petrosyan, Petros – painter
Pinajian, Arthur – painter
Pushman, Hovsep – painter

R 
Roslin, Toros – medieval painter

S 
Kamsar (Kamo Sahakyan)
Suren Safaryan (Safar)
Sureniants, Vardges
Saroyan, William – writer, painter
Sarkissian, Ararat – painter
Sarkissian, Arthur – painter
Sarkissian, Arshak – painter
Saryan, Martiros – painter
Shahinian, Maryam – photographer
Shiraz, Ara – sculptor
Shiraz, Hovhannes – poet
Shiraz, Sipan – poet, sculptor and painter
Simonyan, Hripsime – sculptor, People's Artist of Armenia
Simonian, Nariné – organist, pianist and music director
Sirabyan, Bedros – painter
Siravyan, Gagik – painter
Siravyan, Nune – painter, theatre critic
Sargsyan, Maro – painter
Smbatyan, Karen – painter
Spendiaryan, Alexander – composer

T 
Tankian, Serj – musician
Terlemezian, Panos – painter
Terteryan, Avet – classical composer
Tunçboyacıyan, Arto – Turkish-Armenian avant-garde folk musician
Tutundjian, Léon – painter
Tumanyan, Nune – sculptor

V 
Valmar – Armenian painter; People's artist of the Republic of Armenia (2015)
Vahramian, Vartan – musician, painter
Vardapetyan, Armen – jeweler, artist, sculpture; Armenian folk artist of applied art

Y 
Yazmaciyan, Garabet – painter
Georgy Bogdanovich Yakulov – painter

See also
List of Armenian women artists

References

Artists

Lists of artists by nationality